Honeydew may refer to:

 Honeydew (melon), a cultivar group of melon
 Honeydew (secretion), a sugar-rich sticky substance secreted by various animals
 Honeydew moth (Cryptoblabes gnidiella), a moth of Southern and Middle America
 Honeydew, California, United States, a town
 Honeydew, West Virginia, United States, an unincorporated community
 Honeydew (color), a pale shade of the color spring green
 Bunsen Honeydew, a fictional character from The Muppets franchise
 Honeydew (album), a 2008 album by Shawn Mullins
 Honeydew (film), a 2020 American horror film written and directed by Devereux Milburn
 Honey Dew Donuts, a Massachusetts-based franchise selling donuts and other breakfast foods
 Fuller's Organic Honey Dew, a brand of pale ale brewed by Fuller's Brewery
 Simon "Honeydew" Lane, a member of internet gaming group The Yogscast